The Centennial Voyageur Canoe Pageant was a canoe race started on May 24, 1967 in the Rocky Mountains by ten teams representing eight provinces and the Yukon Territory and Northwest Territories. Prince Edward Island and Newfoundland, the two remaining provinces were not entered.  were paddled and portaged in 104 days by 100 men using six man shifts per team. They arrived in Montreal on September 4. Other privately sponsored canoes from across the country made similar trips.
As of March 2012, it still holds the Guinness record for longest canoeing race in history.

Beginnings

The Centennial Commission was started in 1963, with the mandate of organizing numerous projects 
to promote the first Canadian Centennial. Regional governments advertised for participants. Every man that officially completed the trip would receive $1000 (CDN$ in  dollars). The winning team an additional $1,500 per man and $500 for 2nd/3rd.  There were other contests along the route as well.

The canoes
Twelve canoes were built for promotion and trials in 1966 by the Chestnut Canoe Company. The 10 canoes used the following year in the race were built by Moise Cadorette.

The route

Expo 67 Official Guide Book Schedule:
Day 1 Rocky Mountain House – Wed, May 24
Day 4 Edmonton – May 27
Day 9 Lloydminster – June 1
Day 11 North Battleford – June 3
Day 12 Saskatoon – June 4
Day 15 Prince Albert – June 7
Day 18 Nipawin – June 10
Day 21 The Pas – June 13
Day 34 Portage la Prairie – June 26
Day 39 Winnipeg – July 1
Day 40 Selkirk – July 2
Day 48 Kenora – July 10
Day 52 Fort Frances – July 14
Day 62 Fort William – July 24
Day 80 Sault Ste. Marie – August 11
Day 91 North Bay – August 22
Day 94 Deep River – August 25
Day 95 Pembroke – August 26
Day 96 Campbell's Bay, P.Q. – August 27
Day 97 Arnprior – August 28
Day 98 Ottawa – August 29
Day 104 Montreal Expo67 – Fri, September 4

See also

Expo 67
Don Starkell
Hudson's Bay Company forts and trading posts
Voyageurs

Books and periodicals

Guilloux, Doreen: Paddling, Portaging & Pageantry: 2007: 
Dean, Misao: The Centennial Voyageur Canoe Pageant as Historical Re-enactment: Journal of Canadian Studies: Vol 40.3 pp. 43–67: 2006
Berton, Pierre: 1967: The Last Good Year: Toronto: Doubleday Canada: 1997:

References

http://archives.cbc.ca/sports/exploits/clips/7716/&ref=spe
http://www.allbusiness.com/north-america/canada/4062690-1.html
http://expo67.ncf.ca/
http://expo67.ncf.ca/expo_67_40th_anniversary_edition_p6.html
http://expo67.ncf.ca/expo_67_news_p35.html Ottawa Journal Article
http://expo67.ncf.ca/expo_67_news_p37.html
http://expo67.ncf.ca/expo_67_news_p38.html

External links
https://www.youtube.com/watch?v=eGm5mw8Bq9c

Canadian Centennial
Expo 67
Records in canoeing
Canoeing and kayaking competitions in Canada
1967 in Canada
History of Canada (1960–1981)
Canadian historical anniversaries